Avanjan (also Romanized as Avanjān and Āvenjān; also known as Avangūn and Āvangūn) is a village in Ramjerd-e Do Rural District, Dorudzan District, Marvdasht County, Fars Province, Iran. At the 2006 census, its population was 842, in 192 families.

References 

Populated places in Marvdasht County